Colonel Dennis Michael Royal Eagan (13 August 1926 – 1 July 2012) was a British field hockey player who competed in the 1952 Summer Olympics as a member of the British field hockey team, which won the bronze medal. He played all three matches as halfback.

Born in Quetta, British India, Eagan was educated at Gresham's School and had a distinguished career in the Royal Engineers separate from his achievements in hockey. After he ceased playing hockey he became a respected administrator in the game, as secretary of the Hockey Association and European Hockey Association, and treasurer and then vice-president of the British Olympic Association.

References

External links
 
profile

1926 births
2012 deaths
British male field hockey players
Olympic field hockey players of Great Britain
Field hockey players at the 1952 Summer Olympics
Olympic bronze medallists for Great Britain
Olympic medalists in field hockey
People educated at Gresham's School
Royal Engineers officers
Medalists at the 1952 Summer Olympics
20th-century British Army personnel